This a partial list of notable faculty (either past, present, or visiting) at the Graduate Center, CUNY.

Awards and prizes

Among the Graduate Center's faculty are recipients of the Pulitzer Prize, the Nobel Prize, the Lakatos Award, the National Medals of Humanities and Science, the Bancroft Prize, Grammy Award, Guggenheim Fellowship, the George Jean Nathan Award for Dramatic Criticism, New York City Mayor's Award for Excellence in Science and Technology, the Lakatos Award, and the Presidential Early Career Award for Scientists and Engineers, as well as  memberships in the American Academy of Arts and Sciences and the National Academy of Sciences.

Nobel Laureates
In 1997, Queens College recruited future Nobel laureate and co-discoverer of the human immunodeficiency virus Luc Montagnier, appointing him to an endowed professorship. Montagnier was subsequently added to the faculty of the Graduate Center in the department of biology.

In 2015, the Graduate Center recruited Nobel laureate Paul Krugman to the faculty. Krugman joined the faculty on a dual appointment, both to the university's Ph.D. program in economics and as a distinguished scholar at the Graduate Center's Stone Center on Socio-Economic Inequality. At the Stone Center, Krugman's colleagues include political scientist and sociologist Janet Gornick as well as economist Branko Milanovic.

American Academy of the Arts and Sciences

National Academy of Sciences

Guggenheim Fellows

MacArthur Fellows

Pulitzer Prize

National Medal of Arts

National Medal of Science

Rolf Schock Prize

Alan T. Waterman Award

Presidential Early Career Award for Scientists and Engineers

Grammy Award

Bancroft Prize

Notable faculty by department

The Graduate Center's employment of faculty operates according to a unique consortium model, which both hosts 140 faculty with sole appointments exclusively at the Graduate Center, often senior scholars in their respective disciplines, and provides joint appointments to 1,800 faculty from the thirteen senior colleges and seven community colleges in the CUNY system to teach classes and advise graduate students.

Anthropology

Talal Asad, Distinguished Professor of Anthropology
Vincent Crapanzano, Distinguished Professor of Anthropology and Comparative Literature
David Harvey, Distinguished Professor of Anthropology
Eleanor Leacock, Former Professor of Anthropology at the Graduate Center and the City College of New York 
Setha Low, Professor of Anthropology
Leith Mullings, Distinguished Professor of Anthropology
Sydel Silverman, Former Distinguished Professor of Anthropology at the Graduate Center and Queens College
Katherine Verdery, Distinguished Professor of Anthropology
Bianca Williams,  Associate Professor of Anthropology
Eric Wolf, Former Distinguished Professor of Anthropology

Art History

Claire Bishop, Professor of Art History
Rosemarie Haag Bletter, Professor Emeritus of 19th and 20th Century European and American Architecture and Theory
Anna C. Chave, Professor Emeritus of Contemporary Art and Theory, 20th-Century European and American Art
William H. Gerdts, Professor Emeritus of 18th and 19th Century American Painting and Sculpture
David Joselit, Distinguished Professor of Art History
Rosalind E. Krauss, Former Distinguished Professor at the Graduate Center and Hunter College
Gail Levin, Distinguished Professor of 20th Century and Contemporary Art
Patricia Mainardi, Professor Emeritus of 18th and 19th Century European Art at the Graduate Center and Brooklyn College
Eloise Quiñones Keber, Professor Emeritus of Pre-Columbian Art and Colonial Art of the Americas at the Graduate Center and Baruch College

Classics 

Sarah B. Pomeroy, Professor Emeritus
Joy Connolly, Distinguished Professor and Interim President

Computer Science

Sergei N. Artemov, Distinguished Professor of Computer Science
Melvin Fitting, Professor Emeritus of Computer Science at the Graduate Center and the City College of New York
Robert Haralick, Distinguished Professor of Computer Science
Gabor Herman, Distinguished Professor of Computer Science
Saul Kripke, Distinguished Professor of Computer Science and Philosophy
Lev Manovich, Professor of Computer Science
Victor Pan, Distinguished Professor of Computer Science
Rohit Jivanlal Parikh, Distinguished Professor of Computer Science and Philosophy at the Graduate Center and Brooklyn College
Theodore Raphan, Distinguished Professor of Computer Science
Stathis Zachos, Professor Emeritus of Computer Science at the Graduate Center and Brooklyn College

Earth and Environmental Sciences

Ruth Wilson Gilmore, Professor of Geography
Neil Smith, Former Distinguished Professor of Geography

Economics

Robert D. Cherry, Professor of Economics at the Graduate Center and Brooklyn College
Randall K. Filer, Professor of Economics at the Graduate Center and Hunter College
Michael Grossman, Distinguished Professor Emeritus of Economics
David A. Jaeger, Professor of Economics
Paul Krugman, Distinguished Professor of Economics
Ted Joyce, Professor of Economics at the Graduate Center and Baruch College
Salih Neftçi, Former Professor of Economics

English

Ammiel Alcalay, Professor of English at the Graduate Center and Queens College
Meena Alexander, Former Distinguished Professor of English at the Graduate Center and Hunter College
John Brenkman, Distinguished Professor of English at the Graduate Center and Baruch College
Mary Ann Caws, Distinguished Professor of English
Cathy Davidson, Distinguished Professor of English
Ashley Dawson, Professor of English at the Graduate Center and the College of Staten Island
Morris Dickstein, Distinguished Professor Emeritus, Senior Fellow at the Center for the Humanities
David Greetham, Distinguished Professor Emeritus at the Graduate Center and Bronx Community College
N. John Hall, Distinguished Professor Emeritus
bell hooks, Former Distinguished Professor of English at the Graduate Center and the City College of New York
Irving Howe, Former Distinguished Professor of English at the Graduate Center and Hunter College
Fred Kaplan, Distinguished Professor Emeritus at the Graduate Center and Queens College
Alfred Kazin, Former Distinguished Professor Emeritus of English at Hunter College and the Graduate Center
Wayne Koestenbaum, Distinguished Professor of English
Eric Lott, Professor of English
Louis Menand, Former Distinguished Professor of English
Nancy K. Miller, Distinguished Professor of English
Feisal G. Mohamed, Professor of English
Robert Reid-Pharr, Professor of English
David S. Reynolds, Distinguished Professor 
David Savran, Distinguished Professor of English, Vera Mowry Roberts Chair in American Theatre
Eve Sedgwick, Former Distinguished Professor of English
Ira Shor, Professor of English at the Graduate Center and the College of Staten Island
Michele Wallace, Professor of English at the Graduate Center and the City College of New York

French
John Kneller, Former Professor Emeritus of French at the Graduate Center and Brooklyn College

History

Paul Avrich, Former Distinguished Professor of History at the Graduate Center and Queens College
Laird Bergad, Distinguished Professor of History at the Graduate Center and Lehman College
Randolph L. Braham, Former Distinguished Professor Emeritus of History at Hunter College and the City College of New York
Joshua Brown, Adjunct Professor and Executive Director of the American Social History Project and the Center for Media and Learning
Blanche Wiesen Cook, Distinguished Professor of History at the Graduate Center and John Jay College of Criminal Justice
Eric Foner, Former Professor of History at the Graduate Center and the City College of New York
Joshua Freeman, Distinguished Professor of History at the Graduate Center and Queens College
Herbert Gutman, Former Distinguished Professor of History
Dagmar Herzog, Distinguished Professor
KC Johnson, Professor of History at the Graduate Center and Brooklyn College
James Oakes, Distinguished Professor
Joan Wallach Scott, Adjunct Professor
Arthur M. Schlesinger Jr., Former Albert Schweitzer Professor of Humanities
Judith Stein, Former Distinguished Professor of History at the Graduate Center and the City College of New York
Clarence Taylor, Professor Emeritus of History at the Graduate Center and Baruch College
Mike Wallace, Distinguished Professor of History at the Graduate Center and John Jay College of Criminal Justice
Eric D. Weitz, Distinguished Professor of History at the Graduate Center and the City College of New York

Linguistics

Juliette Blevins, Professor of Linguistics
Janet Dean Fodor, Distinguished Professor of Linguistics
Loraine Obler, Distinguished Professor of Linguistics
Virginia Valian, Distinguished Professor of Linguistics the Graduate Center and Hunter College
Douglas Whalen, Distinguished Professor of Linguistics

Mathematics

 Sergei N. Artemov, Distinguished Professor of Mathematics
 Jason Behrstock, Professor of Mathematics
 Melvin Fitting, Professor Emeritus of Mathematics
 Alexander Gamburd, Presidential Professor of Mathematics
 Michael Handel, Professor of Mathematics
 Linda Keen, Professor Emerita of Mathematics
 Olga Kharlampovich, Mary P. Dolciani Professor of Mathematics
 Victor Kolyvagin, Mina Rees Chair in Mathematics
 Ádám Korányi, Distinguished Professor Emeritus of Mathematics
  Ravi S. Kulkarni, Distinguished Professor Emeritus of Mathematics
 Melvyn B. Nathanson, Professor of Mathematics
 Rohit Parikh, Distinguished Professor of Mathematics
 Enrique Pujals, Professor of Mathematics
 Michael Shub, Martin and Michele Cohen Professor of Mathematics
 Christina Sormani, Professor of Mathematics
 Dennis Sullivan, Albert Einstein Chair in Science (Mathematics)
 Lucien Szpiro, Distinguished Professor of Mathematics

Philosophy

Linda Martín Alcoff, Professor of Philosophy
Noël Carroll, Distinguished Professor of Philosophy
Michael Devitt, Distinguished Professor of Philosophy
Melvin Fitting, Professor Emeritus of Philosophy at the Graduate Center and Lehman College
Miranda Fricker, Presidential Professor of Philosophy
Peter Godfrey-Smith, Adjunct and Former Distinguished Professor of Philosophy
Carol C. Gould, Distinguished Professor of Philosophy and Political Science, Director of the Center for Global Ethics and Politics at the Ralph Bunche Institute for International Studies
Joel David Hamkins, Professor of Philosophy
Virginia Held, Distinguished Professor Emeritus at the Graduate Center and Hunter College
Serene Khader, Professor of Philosophy at the Graduate Center and Jay Newman Chair in Philosophy of Culture at Brooklyn College
Saul Kripke, Distinguished Professor of Philosophy and Computer Science
Douglas P. Lackey, Professor of Philosophy at the Graduate Center and Baruch College
Michael Levin, Professor Emeritus of Philosophy at the Graduate Center and the City College of New York
Charles W. Mills, Distinguished Professor of Philosophy
Stephen Neale, Distinguished Professor of Philosophy and Linguistics and Kornblith Chair in the Philosophy of Science and Value
David Papineau, Visiting Presidential Professor of Philosophy
Massimo Pigliucci, Professor of Philosophy at the Graduate Center and the City College of New York
Graham Priest, Distinguished Professor of Philosophy
Jesse Prinz, Distinguished Professor of Philosophy
David M. Rosenthal, Distinguished Professor of Philosophy
Nathan Salmon, Visiting Professor of Philosophy
Galen Strawson, Former Distinguished Professor of Philosophy at the Graduate Center
Marx Wartofsky, Former Distinguished Professor of Philosophy at the Graduate Center and Baruch College

Physics

Robert Alfano, Distinguished Professor of Science and Engineering at the City College of New York and Graduate Center
Andrea Alù, Einstein Professor of Physics and Director of the Photonics Initiative at the Advanced Science Research Center
William Bialek, Visiting Presidential Professor of Physics
Xi-Cheng Zhang, Assistant Professor of Physics
Eugene Chudnovsky, Distinguished Professor of Physics at Lehman College and the Graduate Center
Dmitry Garanin, Professor of Physics at Lehman College and the Graduate Center
Swapan K. Gayen, Distinguished Professor of Physics at the City College of New York and Graduate Center
Azriel Z. Genack, Distinguished Professor of Physics at Queens College and the CUNY Graduate Center
Daniel Greenberger, Distinguished Professor of Physics at the City College of New York and Graduate Center
Godfrey Gumbs, Distinguished Professor of Physics at Hunter College and Graduate Center
Michio Kaku, Henry Semat Professor of Physics the City College of New York and Graduate Center
V. Parmeswaran Nair, Distinguished Professor of Physics at the City College of New York and Graduate Center
Matthew O'Dowd J., Professor of Physics at Lehman College and the Graduate Center

Political science

Randolph L. Braham, Distinguished Professor Emeritus of Political Science at the Graduate Center and City College of New York
Susan Buck-Morss, Distinguished Professor of Political Science
Mitchell Cohen, Professor of Political Science at the Graduate Center and Baruch College
Paisley Currah, Professor of Political Science at the Graduate Center and Brooklyn College
Robert Engler, Professor Emeritus of Political Science at the Graduate Center and New York City College of Technology
Joseph S. Murphy (1933-1998), President of Queens College, President of Bennington College, and Chancellor of the City University of New York
Francis Fox Piven, Distinguished Professor Emeritus of Political Science
Andrew Hacker, Professor Emeritus of Political Science at the Graduate Center and Queens College
Michael Harrington, Former Distinguished Professor of Political Science at the Graduate Center and Queens College
Uday Singh Mehta, Distinguished Professor of Political Science
Ralph Miliband, Former Visiting Professor of Political Science
John Mollenkopf, Distinguished Professor of Political Science and Sociology
Stanley Renshon, Professor of Political Science and Lehman College
Corey Robin, Professor of Political Science at the Graduate Center and Brooklyn College
Dankwart Rustow, Former Distinguished Professor of Political Science and Sociology
Thomas G. Weiss, Distinguished Professor of Political Science
Susan L. Woodward, Professor of Political Science
Donald S. Zagoria, Professor Emeritus of Political Science at the Graduate Center and Hunter College

Psychology

Roger Hart, Professor of Environmental Psychology and Earth and Environmental Sciences 
Charles Kadushin, Professor of Psychology, recipient of the 2009 Marshall Sklare Award
Cindi Katz, Professor of Environmental Psychology and Earth and Environmental Sciences 
Stanley Milgram, Former Distinguished Professor of Psychology
Kevin Nadal, Distinguished Professor of Psychology
David Rindskopf, Distinguished Professor of Psychology
Susan Saegert, Professor of Environmental Psychology 
Anna Stetsenko, Professor of Human Development and Urban Education
Katherine Nelson, Professor of Psychology

Sociology

Richard Alba, Distinguished Professor of Sociology
Stanley Aronowitz, Distinguished Professor Emeritus of Sociology and Urban Education
Juan Battle, Professor of Sociology, Public Health, and Urban Education
Frank Bonilla, Former Thomas Hunter Professor of Sociology at the Graduate Center and Hunter College
Bogdan Denitch, Former Professor Emeritus of Sociology
Mitchell Duneier, Former Distinguished Professor of Sociology
Cynthia Fuchs Epstein, Distinguished Professor Emeritus of Sociology
Stuart Ewen, Distinguished Professor of Sociology at the Graduate Center and Hunter College
Samuel Farber, Professor Emeritus of Sociology
Nancy Foner, Distinguished Professor of Sociology
Gerald S. Handel, Professor Emeritus of Sociology at the Graduate Center and the City College of New York
Michael P. Jacobson, Director of CUNY Institute for State and Local Governance
James M. Jasper, Professor of Sociology 
Philip Kasinitz, Presidential Professor of Sociology at the Graduate Center and Hunter College
Judith Lorber, Professor Emeritus of Sociology and Women's Studies at the Graduate Center and Brooklyn College
Setsuko Matsunaga Nishi, Former Professor Emeritus of Sociology at the Graduate Center and Brooklyn College
Ruth Milkman, Distinguished Professor of Sociology, Associate Director of the Joseph S. Murphy Institute
Pyong Gap Min, Professor of Sociology at the Graduate Center and Queens College, Director of the Research Center for Korean Community
Peter Moskos, Professor of Sociology at the Graduate Center and the John Jay College of Criminal Justice
Victoria Pitts-Taylor, Former Professor of Sociology at the Graduate Center and Queens College
Barbara Katz Rothman, Professor of Sociology, Public Health, Disability Studies and Women's Studies at the Graduate Center and Baruch College
Carroll Seron, Former Professor of Sociology at the Graduate Center and Baruch College
Iván Szelényi, Former Distinguished Professor of Sociology
John Torpey, Professor of Sociology and History, Director of Ralph Bunche Institute for International Studies
Bryan Turner, Presidential Professor of Sociology
Jock Young, Distinguished Professor of Criminal Justice and Sociology
Sharon Zukin, Professor of Sociology at the Graduate Center and Brooklyn College

References

Lists of people by university or college in New York City